Chlorurus sordidus, known commonly as the daisy parrotfish  or bullethead parrotfish, is a species of marine fish in the family Scaridae.

Description
The initial phase has very variable colouration. The smaller fishes can be a uniform dark brown to light gray and they may or may not possess a light band surrounding a dark spot on the caudal peduncle. Larger specimens can show a series of irregular rows of small, light spots towards the tail or they may have the light band surrounding the dark spot on the caudal peduncle. The terminal phase, male, is also variable and may have a large tan area on the flanks or on its caudal peduncle. It has a rounded snout. 
 
Chlorurus sordidus is a medium size fish and can reach a maximum size of  length.

Distribution
Chlorurus sordidus is widespread throughout the tropical waters of the Indo-Pacific region, Red Sea included.

Habitat and biology
Before going to sleep, Chlorurus sordidus secretes a mucus which surrounds the fish in a complete cocoon. The purpose of this mucus cocoon is not completely understood, but one theory is that it protects the fish from parasitic gnathiids. This species is known to be predated on by the honeycomb grouper (Epinephelus merra) and the coral trout (Plectropomus leopardus), its parasites include the monogenean Benedenia scari. It is a sociable fish which schools with other parrotfishes such as Scarus psittacus.

Chlorurus sordidus is one of the most widespread species of parrotfish, and it is highly variable with some of the geographically determined forms probably being at least subspecies. It occurs in both coral rich and open pavement areas of shallow reef flats, in lagoon reefs and seaward reefs, it can also be found at drop-offs. The juveniles inhabit areas of coral rubble in reef flats and lagoons. The juveniles and females in their initial phase form large groups that move long distances between their feeding grounds and the areas used for sleeping at night. They feed on benthic algae.

Taxonomy
Chlorurus sordidus has been split by some authorities and the Red Sea dn Indian Ocean populations are regarded as C. sordidus while Chlorurus spilurus occurs in the Pacific and Eastern Indian Ocean, this is based on mitochondrial DNA sequencing and on morphological data. It is also probable that the Red Sea population will also be demonstrated to be specifically distinct. Scarus sordidus was described by the Swedish explorer, orientalist and naturalist Peter Forsskål (1732-1763), the description was published in 1775 with the type locality being Hurghada in Egypt.

References

External links

http://www.marinespecies.org/aphia.php?p=taxdetails&id=219082
https://www.zesea.com/en/parrot-fish-working-for-coral-reefs/
 

sordidus
Fish of Palau
Fish described in 1775
Taxa named by Peter Forsskål